David Rait (c. 1560–1632)  was a Scottish clergyman in the Church of Scotland who was minister of St Machar's Cathedral in Aberdeen and served as Moderator of the General Assembly in Aberdeen in 1605.

Life

He was from the family of Rait of Hallgreen in The Mearns. In 1598 he replaced Alexander Arbuthnot as minister of St Machar's Cathedral in Old Aberdeen. At the same time he served as Principal of the nearby King's College, Aberdeen. In his role as Moderator of the Synod he chaired the General Assembly in Aberdeen in 1605. He was awarded a Doctor of Divinity in 1620. He retired from St Machar's in 1621 being replaced by Alexander Scrogie but continued as Principal of King's College until he died in 1632.

Family
In December 1592 he married Elizabeth Allardice, daughter of John Allardice of Allardice Castle. They had one son, James Rait.

References

1560 births
1632 deaths
Academics of the University of Aberdeen

Year of birth uncertain
Moderators of the General Assembly of the Church of Scotland
16th-century Ministers of the Church of Scotland
17th-century Ministers of the Church of Scotland